Betrayal is a 1978 American made-for-television drama film directed by Paul Wendkos and starring Rip Torn and Lesley Ann Warren, based on a non-fiction book by Julie Roy with Lucy Freedman.  The subject is a real life lawsuit about a woman who sued her psychiatrist after he allegedly lured her into a sexual relationship.  The film was first aired on NBC Monday Night at the Movies on November 13, 1978.

Plot
Julie Roy, a young woman, approaches a maverick attorney, claiming that her psychoanalyst has raped her, and over a period of time used her for sex before discarding her.

Cast

References

External links
 

Films directed by Paul Wendkos
1978 television films
1978 films
NBC network original films